Sayed Badiuzzama (born 26 December 1992) is an Indian cricketer. He made his List A debut on 3 March 2014, for Goa in the 2013–14 Vijay Hazare Trophy.

References

External links
 

1992 births
Living people
Indian cricketers
Goa cricketers
Place of birth missing (living people)